The 2015 Carlow Senior Hurling Championship was the 86th staging of the Carlow Senior Hurling Championship since its establishment by the Carlow County Board in 1887. The championship began on 11 July 2015 and ended on 18 October 2015.

St. Mullin's were the defending champions.

On 18 October 2015, St. Mullin's won the championship following a 1-14 to 0-10 defeat of Mount Leinster Rangers in the final. This was their 25th championship title, their second in succession.

Results

Semi-finals

Final

References

Carlow Senior Hurling Championship
Carlow Senior Hurling Championship